The antisolar point is the abstract point on the celestial sphere directly opposite the Sun from an observer's perspective. This means that the antisolar point lies above the horizon when the Sun is below it, and vice versa. On a sunny day, the antisolar point can be easily found; it is located within the shadow of the observer's head. Like the zenith and nadir, the antisolar point is not fixed in three-dimensional space, but is defined relative to the observer. Each observer has an antisolar point that moves as the observer changes position.

The antisolar point forms the geometric center of several optical phenomena, including subhorizon haloes, rainbows, glories, the Brocken spectre, and heiligenschein. Occasionally, around sunset or sunrise, anticrepuscular rays appear to converge toward the antisolar point near the horizon. However, this is an optical illusion caused by perspective; in reality, the "rays" (i.e. bands of shadow) run near-parallel to each other.

Also around the antisolar point, the gegenschein is often visible in a moonless night sky away from city lights, arising from the backscatter of sunlight by interplanetary dust. In astronomy, the full Moon or a planet in opposition lies near the antisolar point. During a total lunar eclipse, the full Moon enters the umbra of Earth's shadow, which the planet casts onto its atmosphere, into space, and toward the antisolar point.

Anthelic point 
The anthelic point is often used as a synonym for the antisolar point, but the two should be differentiated.
While the antisolar point is directly opposite the sun, always below the horizon when the sun is up, the anthelic point is opposite but at the same elevation as the sun, and is therefore located on the parhelic circle. There are several halo phenomena that are centered on or converge on the anthelic point, such as the anthelion, Wegener arcs, Tricker arcs and the parhelic circle itself.

See also 

 Heiligenschein
 Opposition surge
 Subparhelic circle
 Sylvanshine

References 

Spherical astronomy